The Ngoyla Faunal Reserve is a 1,566 sq km-large protected area, which is situated in the south-eastern part of Cameroon.  It is an important shelter and corridor for the Congolian rainforests megafauna within the tri-national Dja-Odzala-Minkébé protected area complex (TRIDOM).

Description 
The Ngoyla Faunal Reserve was officially created by the MINFOF (Ministry of Forestry and Wildlife) in 2014 with the support of WWF. It is found in the south-central part of the Ngoyla-Mintom massif. The climate of the reserve is tropical with two wet and two dry seasons. Characteristic vegetation types are humid evergreen rainforests (82%), swamp forests (15%), natural forest clearances (2%), and secondary forest-farmbush mosaics (1%). Its biodiversity is notable; 230 fish, 280 bird, and 37 large and medium-sized mammal species have been recorded. Notable mammal species are the African forest elephant (Loxodonta cyclotis), western lowland gorilla (Gorilla gorilla gorilla), central chimpanzee (Pan troglodytes troglodytes), mandrill (Mandrillus sphinx), leopard (Panthera pardus), African forest buffalo (Syncerus caffer nanus), western bongo (Tragelaphus eurycerus), sitatunga (Tragelaphus spekii), and forest duikers. Besides the high density and diversity of forest animals, the Ngolya Faunal Reserve is an important corridor to migrating species, such as forest elephants by connecting the Dja Faunal Reserve, the Nki National Park, and the Minkébé National Park of Gabon, due to its location within the TRIDOM complex.

Tourism 

The Ngoyla Faunal Reserve is relatively close to the capital Yaoundé (450 km), compared to most of the popular Congo Basin protected areas of Cameroon. It is a stronghold of large mammals; in addition, it is rich in forest clearances that attract forest elephants, gorillas, and forest buffalos, making an excellent destination for wildlife lovers. The largest natural forest clearance, the 14 hectares-large Namodomo is a subject of an ecotourism development project, which aims to establish a wildlife observation tower and accommodation for international ecotourism.

See also 

 Protected areas of Cameroon
 Wildlife of Cameroon
 Dja Faunal Reserve
 Nki National Park
 Minkébé National Park

References 

Protected areas of Cameroon
Faunal reserves